Phowintaung (also spelt as Hpowindaung, Powintaung, Po Win Taung) is a Buddhist cave complex located approximately  west of Monywa and  southeast of Yinmabin, in Yinmabin Township, Monywa District, Sagaing Region, Northern Burma (Myanmar). It is located on the western bank of the Chindwin River. The name of the complex means Mountain of Isolated Solitary Meditation.

The complex contains 947 small and large richly decorated caves. It is carved into a sandstone outcrop and contains numerous carved Buddha statues and mural paintings of geometric patterns and Jataka stories. The statues and paintings have been dated to between the 14th and 18th centuries.

Accessibility

It is accessible from Monywa either by direct road over the new bridge or by a ferry across the Chindwin and then taking a jeep at the scenic Nyaungbin village.

Gallery

References 
Monywa - Santa Maria Travel and Tours
Monywa and Powin Daung
Luminous Journeys Travel

External links 
Photos of Phowintaung
Panoramio pictures for Phowintaung

Buddhist caves in Myanmar
Buddhist temples in Myanmar
Sagaing Region
Tourist attractions in Myanmar